Prince Pyotr Alexeyevich Golitsyn (22 January 1792 in Moscow, Russian Empire – 16 October 1842 in Paris, France) was a Russian prince, a member of the Patriotic War and foreign campaigns, and a Catholic convert from Russian Orthodoxy.

Biography

He was born on 22 January 1792 in Moscow in the family of Alexei and Alexandra Golitsyna. In 1817 in Kiev, married a Polish girl Elżbieta Zlotnitskoy, who was in love with a famous poet Denis Davydov. In 1820 under the influence of his wife and her mother he converted to Catholicism. In 1837, his wife with their children (three sons and one daughter) had moved abroad, the prince bought land in Paris where he settled with his family. He died in Paris on 16 October 1842.

References

External links
 http://www.nasledie-smolensk.ru/pkns/index.php?option=com_content&task=view&id=2712&Itemid=126
 http://ru.rodovid.org/wk/%D0%97%D0%B0%D0%BF%D0%B8%D1%81%D1%8C:164473
 https://archive.today/20130703061647/http://www.gzhatsk.net/history_gzhatsk_villages/istoriya_derevni_stolbovo.html

Converts to Roman Catholicism
Converts to Roman Catholicism from Eastern Orthodoxy
Former Russian Orthodox Christians
Russian Roman Catholics
Pyotr Alexeyevich
1792 births
1842 deaths
Russian princes